Bazgard (also Romanized as Bāzgard; also known as Bāzgar and Bāzgīr) is a village in Byaban Rural District, Byaban District, Minab County, Hormozgan Province, Iran. At the 2006 census, its population was 486, in 77 families.

References 

Populated places in Minab County